China Formula Grand Prix (CFGP), formerly known as Asian Geely Formula International Open Competition, is an open wheel formula racing class in China.

The car, co-designed by Geely, China's biggest private-owned vehicle producer and racing cars production company Van Diemen, marks the first time that a Chinese domestic car producer is involved in the racing car design.

CFGP uses a 1.8-litre 4G18 engine; the car weighs 490 kg and has a maximum speed of 240 km/h. The engine can produce 140 bhp at 6,300 rpm and 172 N/m of torque at 4,100 rpm. After an adjustment to the ECU, the engine can rev up to 8,500 rpm producing 200 bhp.

Promotion
In 2008, reports of the AGF Sepang race appeared on Reuters's huge electronic TV screen at Times Square in New York City.

2011 season calendar
11–12 June Chengdu International Circuit, Chengdu
13-14 Aug Ordos International Circuit, Ordos
15-16 Oct Goldenport Park Circuit, Beijing
19-20 Nov  Guangdong International Circuit, Zhaoqing

2012 season calendar
Official Testing 1–2 May Guangdong International Circuit, Zhaoqing
19–20 May Guangdong International Circuit, Zhaoqing
28–29 July Ordos International Circuit, Ordos
18-19 Aug Goldenport Park Circuit, Beijing
17-18 Nov Chengdu International Circuit, Chengdu

References

External links 
  

One-make series
Formula racing series
Auto racing series in China